The 2017 Ladbrokes World Grand Prix was a professional ranking snooker tournament that took place between 6 and 12 February 2017 at the Guild Hall in Preston, England. It was the third staging of the tournament and the thirteenth ranking event of the 2016/2017 season. The tournament was broadcast in the UK on ITV4.

Shaun Murphy was the defending champion, but lost 2–4 in the quarter-finals to Ryan Day, who went on to reach the final. Barry Hawkins beat Day 10–7 to win his third ranking title.

Prize fund
The breakdown of prize money for this year is shown below:

Winner: £100,000
Runner-up: £40,000
Semi-final: £20,000
Quarter-final: £12,500
Last 16: £7,500
Last 32: £5,000

Highest break: £5,000
Total: £375,000

The "rolling 147 prize" for a maximum break stood at £5,000.

Seeding list

The top 32 players on a one-year ranking list running from the 2016 Riga Masters until the 2017 German Masters qualified for the tournament.

Source:

Main draw

Final

Century breaks

Total: 25

 145, 107  Judd Trump
 142  Martin Gould
 141, 129, 128, 120, 114, 106, 102  Barry Hawkins
 140  Mark Allen
 137, 128  Ronnie O'Sullivan
 134  Ryan Day
 129, 109  Liang Wenbo
 125, 123, 114, 105, 102  Marco Fu
 122  Joe Perry
 121  Jamie Jones
 108  Neil Robertson
 102  Tom Ford

References

2017
2017 in snooker
2017 in English sport
2017
2017
February 2017 sports events in the United Kingdom